The 2010 Teen Choice Awards ceremony was held on August 8, 2010, at the Gibson Amphitheatre, Universal City, California. Several new categories were introduced, separated into "Movie", "TV", "Music", "Summer", "Fashion" and "Other". The ceremony aired on August 9, 2010, on Fox, and was co-hosted by Katy Perry, who also performed, and Cory Monteith, Chris Colfer, Kevin McHale, and Mark Salling from Glee. Alongside Katy, performers included Jason Derulo, Travie McCoy, Justin Bieber and Diddy – Dirty Money.

Presenters
The following celebrities either presented awards and/or performed at the ceremony:

 Lea Michele
 David Archuleta
 Kristen Bell
 Justin Bieber (performed)
 Big Time Rush
 Sandra Bullock
 John Cena
 Miranda Cosgrove
 Joshua Jackson
 Jason Derulo (performed)
 Diddy – Dirty Money (performed)
 Hilary Duff
 Zac Efron
 Ashley Greene
 Victoria Justice
 Kelly Ripa
 Khloé Kardashian
 Kim Kardashian
 Kourtney Kardashian
 Zachary Levi
 George Lopez (as "Kougar Kardashian")
 Justin Long
 LL Cool J
 Bruno Mars (performed)
 Travie McCoy (performed)
 Julianne Hough
 Leighton Meester
 William Moseley
 Shaquille O'Neal
 Jim Parsons
 Katy Perry (hosted/performed)
 Ryan Sheckler
 Yvonne Strahovski
 Shailene Woodley

Performers
listed in order of appearance
 A-Trak 
 Katy Perry – "Teenage Dream"
 Jason Derulo – "Whatcha Say" (intro) and "In My Head"
 Travie McCoy featuring Bruno Mars – "Billionaire"
 Justin Bieber – "U Smile"
 Diddy – Dirty Money – "Hello Good Morning" 
(Bieber's appearance was a pre-recorded performance at his Phoenix, Arizona, tour date.)

Winners and nominees
Nominees were announced in two waves. Over 85 million votes were cast to determine winners. Winners are highlighted in bold text.

Movies

Television

Music

Fashion

Miscellaneous

References

 

Teen Choice Awards
Teen Choice
Teen Choice Awards
2010 in Los Angeles
August 2010 events